Shakira fandom is the name given to the entire community of fans of the Colombian singer Shakira. The community is made up of people of all ages and different cultures. According to the book "Shakira Una Mirada desde el corazón" Shakira enjoyed a "cult" following in the Hispanic communities especially.

According to the television media, the peak of so-called "Shakiramanía" was in the mid-90s when she successfully debuted in the music market, breaking records of that time, and in the words of Rolling Stone, redefining Latin rock and pop. Girls and young people from Latin countries imitated Shakira's appearance, singing and dancing. The wearing of colored braids, leather pants and shirts with bracelets became a trend in the late 90's thanks to Shakira.

Shakira's fandom groups are scattered throughout the world and have been covered by national news for charitable activities as well as confrontations in social networks. Shakira herself witnessed various harassing and obsessed fans who tried to attack the celebrity, violate her privacy or even have the desire to kill her.

Origins

Shakiramanía 
During the mid-90s Shakira was already making a name for herself in the world of Latin music and some parts of Europe thanks to the success of her album "Pies Descalzos", which put her firmly on the music scene and in front of the cameras. In this era Shakira used a look described as very "Rocker", comprising leather pants, bracelets and prominent hair. A sensation in Latin America, the look came to be known as "Shakira fever" or "Shakiramanía". The name and image on Pies Descalzos together with ¿Dónde Están los ladrones? would be referenced for some years as Shakira's essential brand and stage persona as an artist. The album covers' promotional images of Shakira were imitated by her young admirers and led to a trend in Latin American youth at the time.  In countries such as Spain, Turkey, Mexico and Argentina, Shakira's style became a daily fashion for girls and adolescents emulating the singer during her look used during the promotion of her fourth album they wore the thread bracelets and colored braids. Fans loved the hippie look and identified with the sounds that Shakira embodied in her albums. Once the crossover was made to the world market, Shakiramania spread globally with girls from the United States and other countries emulating Shakira's rock style, singing and dancing techniques. In later years, Shakira's bare feet would become a focal point of her image.

Groups and nicknames 
The name of Shakira's fandom is not decided by themselves or by the media, although the word "Shakifans" is widely used to refer to fan groups in Latin American countries, likewise there are variations of this name such as "Wolfies". Various names also change depending on the country although magazines and websites only call them "shakira fans" Shakira's fans are considered to be the most extensive fan base for an overall Latin artist in history. One of the oldest groups about Shakira fans is called "Official Fans Club Shakira Barranquilla" of various young people and adults belonging to the same city of origin of the singer.

Multimedia 
There are several podcasts dedicated mostly to Shakira, one of them is "Shakipedia: A Shakira Podcast" launched in 2002 and is available on services such as Spotify, Apple Podcasts and several other podcast platforms, another not so famous podcast is "Hits Don't Lie" making a play on words with Shakira's song "Hips Don't Lie" also available on streaming services.

Fan Clubs 
Shakira has various fan clubs in Hispanic and foreign countries, the official fan club of Peru is Club Shakira Peru founded in 1996. In countries like Japan, Shakira's fan clubs have also appeared, which were waiting for her upon her arrival in the Asian country. The official name of Shakira's Mexican fan club is called "Las Caderas Mexico"

Fan activism 
Every year Shakira fans get together to carry out charity work in favor of the community, the Peruvian Shakir fan club makes the so-called "Shakichocolatadas" to provide a Christmas dinner to the poorest children in the country.  Likewise, Shakira's Colombian fan club organized for the donation of 400 totally new notebooks extracted from already used notebooks, that is, recycled ones that we gathered at a national level and transformed by a foundation.

Shakira Interaction 
Shakira has interacted with her audience on several occasions at her concerts and outside of these, during her show on "The Sun Comes Out World Tour" Shakira had fans come up on stage with her to do a belly dancing routine. Another moment was when a fan managed to pass the security of the stage and ran to hug the artist, who tried to separate her, but Shakira herself prevented it by even giving her a photo of both.

Controversies 
During a stay in Mexico Shakira suffered a theft of her ring by some obsessed fan, In the year 2022, police were seen around Shakira's house as they were on the alert for some obsessive fan who had vandalized Shakira's house in Spain.

See also 

 Cultural Impact of Shakira
 Shakira Impersonator

References 

Shakira
Music fandom